Michael Triegel, born 13 December 1968 in Erfurt, is a German painter, illustrator and graphic artist based in Leipzig. He is associated with the New Leipzig School. He studied painting and graphic art under Arno Rink at the Hochschule für Grafik und Buchkunst Leipzig from 1990 to 1995. His paintings are highly influenced by Renaissance art.

Triegel was baptised in 2014 and  paints Christian subjects. In 2010 he painted an official portrait of Pope Benedict XVI. Instead of having the pope model the conventional way, Triegel was invited to the front row during a general audience. In 2015, Die Zeit called him "Germany's most famous religious artist".

References

1968 births
20th-century German painters
20th-century German male artists
21st-century German painters
21st-century German male artists
German contemporary artists
German male painters
Living people
Artists from Erfurt
Hochschule für Grafik und Buchkunst Leipzig alumni